Aurelio José Pascuttini (born March 19, 1944, in Rosario) is an Argentinian  former football defender. Although he had a lengthy professional career, he only played for two clubs: hometown CA Rosario Central (1956–76) and América de Cali of Colombia (1977–82).  He helped both clubs win championships.

References

1944 births
Living people
Association football defenders
América de Cali footballers
Rosario Central footballers
Argentine footballers
Argentine expatriate footballers
Expatriate footballers in Colombia
Argentina international footballers
Argentine football managers
Footballers from Rosario, Santa Fe